John Scott Award, created in 1816 as the John Scott Legacy Medal and Premium, is presented to men and women whose inventions improved the "comfort, welfare, and happiness of human kind" in a significant way. Since 1919 the Board of Directors of City Trusts of Philadelphia provide this award, recommended by an advisory committee.

In 1822 the first awards were given to thirteen people by the Philadelphia Society for Promoting Agriculture entrusted by the "Corporation of the city of Philadelphia".

The druggist John Scott of Edinburgh organized a $4,000 fund which, after his death in 1815 was administered by a merchant until the first award, a copper medal and "an amount not to exceed twenty dollars", was given in 1822. (At the time, $20 could buy one ox or a 12-volume encyclopedia.) Several hundred recipients have since been selected by the City Council of Philadelphia, which decides from the annual list of nominees made by the Franklin Institute.

Notable recipients 
Most awards have been given for inventions in science and medicine.  Notable
recipients include:
 
Luis W. Alvarez
Frederick G. Banting
John Bardeen
James Black
William T. Bovie
Ralph L. Brinster
Marie Curie
William Duane
Thomas Edison
Alexander Fleming
Peter Koch
Irving Langmuir
Edwin Land
Christian J. Lambertsen
Luther D. Lovekin
Benoît Mandelbrot
Guglielmo Marconi
Edgar Sharp McFadden 
Humberto Fernandez Moran
Kary B. Mullis
Jonas Salk
Glenn Seaborg
Richard E. Smalley
Nikola Tesla
Wright brothers 
Robert Burns Woodward
David Gestetner

Recent winners

See also 
 Carl Roman Abt, A past recipient (1889)

References

External links
The award webpage
The Franklin Institute: The John Scott Legacy Medal
 Medals awarded by The Franklin Institute between 1822 and 2017.

Awards established in 1816
Invention awards
History of Philadelphia
Franklin Institute awards
American awards
1816 establishments in Pennsylvania